The Chengdu Huangcheng Mosque is a mosque in Qingyang District, Chengdu, Sichuan Province, China. It is the largest mosque in Sichuan.

Name
Huangcheng means Palace Wall because of the mosque location near to a palace of a dynasty in the local history of Sichuan, thus the mosque was name such.

History
The mosque was originally constructed in the 16th century. It was first rebuilt in 1858. In 1917, it was heavily damaged during a war. Subsequently, the size was reduced from 6,600 m2 to 5,000 m2 due to financial constraint. The mosque stands at its current site since November 1998.

Architecture
The mosque was constructed with the combination of Arabic, Ming, Qing architectural styles. It consists of the entrance wall, gates, bathroom, library and the main prayer hall. The library consists of Islamic books written in Arabic and Chinese languages. On the first gate, there is a tablet with the name of the mosque hung. On the second gate, there is a tablet with four Chinese characters Kai Tian Gu Jiao (the most ancient religion) hung, which was made during the Qing Dynasty. The mosque houses the headquarters of the Islamic Association of Sichuan Province.

Transportation
The mosque is accessible within walking distance west of Tianfu Square station of Chengdu Metro.

See also
 Islam in China
 List of mosques in China

References

16th-century mosques
Buildings and structures in Chengdu
Mosques in China
16th-century establishments in China